Events from the year 1539 in Ireland.

Incumbent
Lord: Henry VIII

Events
The Geraldine League is founded by Manus O'Donnell and Conn O'Neill and begins its invasion of The Pale.
Dissolution of the Monasteries continues including the start of suppression of those within The Pale. Establishments surrendered include:
Ardee Priory Hospital (6 December) and White Friars Priory.
Arklow Priory.
Athboy Friary.
Athy Priory (30 April).
Bangor Abbey.
Cloncurry Friary (30 April).
Clonmines Friary.
Dundalk Priory Hospital (23 November).
Enniscorthy Abbey and Priory.
Fore Abbey (27 November).
Graney Abbey, Co. Kildare (7 February).
Grey Abbey, Kildare (30 April).
White Abbey, Kildare (April).
Kells Monastery, Co. Meath.
Kilcullen Abbey (by 30 April).
Killodry Priory.
Knock Abbey, Co. Louth.
Lismullin Priory, Co. Meath.
Louth Priory (20 November).
Mellifont Abbey (23 July).
Mullingar Priory (28 November).
Naas Priory (26 July).
Navan Abbey.
Odder Priory, Co. Meath.
Portrane Priory.
Priory Hospital of St. John the Baptist, Drogheda (26 July).
Priory Hospital of St. John the Baptist, Newtown Trim.
Rosbercon Abbey (20 June).
St. Catherine's Priory, Co. Dublin (25 June).
St. Catherine's Priory, Waterford.
St. John the Baptist Hospital, Dublin.
St. Mary's Abbey, Dublin (28 October).
St. Mary's Carmelite Friary, Dublin (3 August).
St. Saviour Dominican Friary, Dublin.
Skreen Friary.
Termonfeckin Abbey.
Tintern Abbey (County Wexford) (seized 25 July).
Tipperary Friary (7 April).
Tristernagh Abbey (by 10 December).
Lands at Monkstown, County Dublin, granted to Sir John Travers, Master of the Ordnance in Ireland.

Births

Deaths
August 26 – Piers Butler, 8th Earl of Ormonde, Lord Treasurer (b. c.1467)

References

 
1530s in Ireland
Ireland
Years of the 16th century in Ireland